Mary Jones may refer to:

People

American
Mary Alice Jones (1898–?), American children's writer
Mary Cover Jones (1896–1987), American psychologist
Mary Ellen Jones (chemist) (1922–1996), American biochemist
Mary Ellen Jones (politician) (born 1936), educator and politician in New York State
Mary Gardiner Jones (1920–2009), first woman to serve as a member of the Federal Trade Commission

Mary Harris Jones (1837–1930), (Mother Jones), community organizer
Mary Jane Richardson Jones (1819-1909), American abolitionist and suffragist
Mary Letitia Jones (1865-1946), Librarian and Head of Los Angeles Public Library 1900-1905
Mary Smith Jones (1819–1907), First Lady of the Republic of Texas

Mary Jones (rower) (born 1986), American rower
Mary Jones (physician) (c. 1828–1908), American physician
Mary Jones (trans woman) (born 1803), American prostitute
Mary Jones Meyer, World Series of Poker champion

British
Mary Jones (poet) (1707–1778), English poet
Mary Jones (actress) (1896–1990), Welsh actress
Mary Jones and her Bible (1784–1864), Welsh girl associated with Bible dissemination
Mary Vaughan Jones (1918–1983), Welsh children's author and schoolteacher
Mary Lloyd Jones (born 1934), Welsh painter and printmaker
Molly Morgan (born 1762), English convict, landowner, and farmer whose birth name was Mary Jones

Mary Kingsmill Jones (1877-1968), Anglo-Irish politician

Brands
Jones Soda#Mary Jones